Confidence-based learning is a system of learning.

History 
The confidence-based learning is a culmination of more than 70 years of academic, commercial, and governmental research into the connection between confidence, correctness, retention, and learning. The first academic paper on the subject was written in 1932.

The framework for confidence-based learning is based primarily around the research of Darwin Hunt, Dieudonne LeClerq, Emir Shuford, and James E. Bruno.

See also

References

Pedagogy
Training